(7 March 1912 – 14 January 1947) was a Japanese Esperantist, also known by her Esperanto pen name Verda Majo (green May).

Life
Teru Hasegawa was born  in 1912 as the second of three children. In 1929 she enrolled at the Women's College of Education in Nara prefecture. She became acquainted to leftist literary circles, and Esperantist circles. She married Liu Ren, who was from Manchuria, in 1936. In April 1937 she went to China. She joined the Chinese resistance to Japan, where she made broadcasts aimed at the Japanese Army.

See also
Japanese dissidence during the Shōwa period
Japanese in the Chinese resistance to the Empire of Japan

References

Further reading

Crossing Empire's Edge: Foreign Ministry Police and Japanese Expansionism in Northeast Asia By Erik Esselstrom Page 139

External links

 

Japanese Esperantists
1912 births
1947 deaths
Writers of Esperanto literature
Japanese Resistance